Ongare Point is a rural settlement in the Western Bay of Plenty District and Bay of Plenty Region of New Zealand's North Island. It is on a headland on the eastern side of Tauranga Harbour, southeast of Katikati Entrance and opposite Matakana Island.

A coastal walkway through a reserve connects Ongare Point to Kauri Point. There is a small sandy beach.

Ngāi Te Rangi's Ōngare Pā was attacked in 1842 by a war party of 50 men led by Tāraia Ngākuti Te Tumuhuia. The local chief Te Whanake and several followers were killed.

Demographics
Ōngare Point-Kauri Point is defined by Statistics New Zealand as a rural settlement. It is part of the wider Tahawai statistical area.

Ongare Point had a population of 117 at the 2018 New Zealand census, an increase of 15 people (14.7%) since the 2013 census, and an increase of 15 people (14.7%) since the 2006 census. There were 54 households, comprising 63 males and 51 females, giving a sex ratio of 1.24 males per female. The median age was 59.6 years (compared with 37.4 years nationally), with 9 people (7.7%) aged under 15 years, 12 (10.3%) aged 15 to 29, 54 (46.2%) aged 30 to 64, and 42 (35.9%) aged 65 or older.

Ethnicities were 94.9% European/Pākehā, 10.3% Māori, 2.6% Pacific peoples, and 5.1% Asian. People may identify with more than one ethnicity.

Although some people chose not to answer the census's question about religious affiliation, 64.1% had no religion, 25.6% were Christian, and 2.6% were Muslim.

Of those at least 15 years old, 24 (22.2%) people had a bachelor's or higher degree, and 21 (19.4%) people had no formal qualifications. The median income was $30,300, compared with $31,800 nationally. 15 people (13.9%) earned over $70,000 compared to 17.2% nationally. The employment status of those at least 15 was that 39 (36.1%) people were employed full-time, 15 (13.9%) were part-time, and 3 (2.8%) were unemployed.

References

Western Bay of Plenty District
Populated places in the Bay of Plenty Region
Populated places around the Tauranga Harbour